Claiton Machado dos Santos (born 7 September 1984) is a Brazilian-Italian footballer who plays as a defender.

Career

Bologna, Milan and loans
Claiton started his professional football career at Bologna and played once in Serie A, on 17 June 2001. Bologna lost to Internazionale 1−2. In January 2002, he was signed by A.C. Milan and played for their Primavera team. On 18 December 2002, he made his debut for the club, coming in as a substitute for Alessandro Costacurta in the Coppa Italia 1/8 finals against Ancona. He was also featured as an unused bench for Milan in Serie A on 24 May 2003, the game right before the 2003 UEFA Champions League Final and 2003 Coppa Italia Final, in which Carlo Ancelotti used 4 youth team players in the starting lineup and another 7 players on the bench. In 2003-04 season, he remain the member of U20 youth team.

In the summer of 2004, he left for Prato on loan, but in January 2005 returned to Milan. In the 2005-06 season, he was loaned out again, this time to Lecco.

Varese
In the summer of 2006, he joined Serie C2 side Varese in a co-ownership deal for €500. He was not the absolute starter of the team, but also played 28 league matches at the champions winning 2008-09 season. In 2009–10 season, he played 20 league matches as starter in 25 league appearances. Varese promotion to Serie B in 2010.

Bari
On 8 July 2011, Claiton was signed by Serie B club Bari on a free transfer and put pen to paper on a three-year deal. However, due to the financial crisis of Bari, he left the club in summer 2013.

Chievo
On 14 August 2013, Claiton was signed by Serie A club Chievo. Bari also signed half of the registration rights of Marco Calderoni for €90,000 on the same day.

Crotone
On 29 July 2014, Claiton was signed by Serie B club Crotone on a free transfer. At the end of the 2015–16 season he was initially released by Crotone, but on 14 July 2016 he signed a new two-year contract with the club.

Cremonese
On 21 July 2017 he was signed by Cremonese.

Catania
On 16 September 2020 Claiton signed a 2-year contract with Catania. On 9 April 2022, he was released together with all of his Catania teammates following the club's exclusion from Italian football due to its inability to overcome a number of financial issues.

Honours
Lega Pro Seconda Divisione: 2009

References

External links
 Profile at AIC.Football.it 
 Lega Serie B profile 
 

1984 births
Living people
Brazilian footballers
Italian footballers
Serie A players
Serie B players
Serie C players
Campo Grande Atlético Clube players
Bologna F.C. 1909 players
A.C. Milan players
A.C. Prato players
Calcio Lecco 1912 players
S.S.D. Varese Calcio players
S.S.C. Bari players
A.C. ChievoVerona players
F.C. Crotone players
U.S. Cremonese players
Catania S.S.D. players
Association football defenders
Sportspeople from Goiás